Henryk Przeździecki (20 February 1909 – 1 November 1977) was a Polish ice hockey goaltender and footballer. He played for Legia Warsaw during his hockey career. He also played for the Poland national ice hockey team at the 1936 and 1948 Winter Olympics and 1937 World Championship. He also played for the Poland national football team as well. He was captured during the invasion of Poland at the onset of the Second World War and spent the rest of the war as a prisoner at Stalag II-B.

References

External links
 

1909 births
1977 deaths
AZS Warszawa (ice hockey) players
Ice hockey players at the 1936 Winter Olympics
Ice hockey players at the 1948 Winter Olympics
Legia Warsaw (ice hockey) players
Olympic ice hockey players of Poland
Poland international footballers
Polish footballers
Polish ice hockey goaltenders
Footballers from Warsaw
People from Warsaw Governorate
Association footballers not categorized by position
Polish military personnel of World War II
Polish prisoners of war in World War II
World War II prisoners of war held by Germany